Elrod is an unincorporated community in Tuscaloosa County, Alabama, United States. Elrod has a post office with ZIP code 35458. Elrod was renamed from Sipsey Turnpike in 1898 after the Mobile and Ohio Railroad reached the community. It was named in honor of William W. Elrod, a local physician.

Climate
The climate in this area is characterized by hot, humid summers and generally mild to cool winters.  According to the Köppen Climate Classification system, Elrod has a humid subtropical climate, abbreviated "Cfa" on climate maps.

References

Unincorporated communities in Tuscaloosa County, Alabama
Unincorporated communities in Alabama